Lalramchullova (born 14 January 1996) is an Indian professional footballer who plays as a defender for Mohammedan in the I-League.

Career
Born in Mizoram, Lalramchullova started his career with Aizawl. He made his professional debut for Aizawl in the I-League on 9 January 2016 against the reigning champions, Mohun Bagan. He came on as an 80th minute substitute as Aizawl lost 3–1.

East Bengal
He joined East Bengal in 2017 and became a regular started for the team. He spent two season with the red and gold brigade before moving on to join arch-rivals Mohun Bagan in 2019.

Mohun Bagan
He joined Mohun Bagan for a season in 2019 however failed to get much game time in their title winning campaign.

Back to East Bengal
On 13 April 2020, the East Bengal club announced the signing of Lalramchullova back from arch-rivals Mohun Bagan for the upcoming season.

Career statistics

Club

Honours

Club
Aizawl FC
I-League (1): 2016–17

East Bengal FC
Calcutta Football League (1): 2017–18

Mohun Bagan
I-League (1): 2019–20

Mohammedan Sporting
Calcutta Football League (1): 2021

References

External links 
 Aizawl Football Club Profile

1996 births
Living people
Indian footballers
Aizawl FC players
East Bengal Club players
Association football defenders
Footballers from Mizoram
I-League 2nd Division players
I-League players
Mohun Bagan AC players
Indian Super League players